Gerald Humphreys (born 14 January 1946) is a Welsh, retired professional footballer who played as a winger. He made a total of 216 Football League appearances for Everton, Crystal Palace and Crewe Alexandra scoring 32 times.

Playing career
Humphreys began his playing career as an apprentice at Everton and went on to make 12 senior appearances for the club between 1965 and 1970, scoring twice. On 8 June 1970, he signed for Crystal Palace and made 11 appearances in the 1970–1971 season, mainly as a substitute, but without scoring. In January 1971, Humphreys moved on to Crewe Alexandra where he made 193 appearances (scoring 30 goals) before moving into non-league football with Rhyl in 1977.

References

External links

Gerry Humphreys at holmesdale.net

1946 births
Living people
People from Llandudno
Sportspeople from Conwy County Borough
Welsh footballers
English Football League players
Association football forwards
Everton F.C. players
Crystal Palace F.C. players
Crewe Alexandra F.C. players
Rhyl F.C. players